Kahauanu Lake (Haywood Waldemar Kahauanu Keolani Lake, also known as Uncle K; January 2, 1932 - March 6, 2011) was a Hawaiian musician whose career lasted for over 60 years. He was the leader of the Kahauanu Lake Trio. He started playing in the 1950s with a "swing-jazz" style of Hawaiian music. He was a ukulele master with a unique left-handed style. He recorded six albums and was one of the founders of the Hawaiian Music Hall of Fame and Saint Louis School's Hui Na Opi’o. Several of his songs have become recognized as Hawaiian-language classics. In 1987 he was named a "Living Treasure" by the Honpa Hongwanji Mission Hawaii. He received the "Lifetime Achievement Award" by the Na Hoku Hanohano in 1989. He received the Hawaii Academy of Recording Arts Lifetime Achievement Award in 1995. He was inducted into the Hawaiian Music Hall of Fame in 2005.

References 

1930s births
2011 deaths
Musicians from Hawaii
People from Hawaii